The Russo-Turkish War of 1768–1774 was a major armed conflict that saw Russian arms largely victorious against the Ottoman Empire. Russia's victory brought parts of Moldavia, the Yedisan between the rivers Bug and Dnieper, and Crimea into the Russian sphere of influence. Through a series of victories accrued by the Russian Empire led to substantial territorial conquests, including direct conquest over much of the Pontic–Caspian steppe, less Ottoman territory was directly annexed than might otherwise be expected due to a complex struggle within the European diplomatic system to maintain a balance of power that was acceptable to other European states and avoided direct Russian hegemony over Eastern Europe. 

Nonetheless, Russia was able to take advantage of the weakened Ottoman Empire, the end of the Seven Years' War, and the withdrawal of France from Polish affairs to assert itself as one of the continent's primary military powers. The war left the Russian Empire in a strengthened position to expand its territory and maintain hegemony over the Polish–Lithuanian Commonwealth, eventually leading to the First Partition of Poland. Turkish losses included diplomatic defeats that saw its decline as a threat to Europe, loss over its exclusive control over the Orthodox millet, and the beginning of European bickering over the Eastern Question that would feature in European diplomacy until the collapse of the Ottoman Empire in the aftermath of World War I.

Background

Russian war with Poland

The war followed internal tensions within  Poland which indirectly challenged the security of the Ottoman Empire and its ally, the Crimean Khanate. The true power behind the Polish throne was the Russian ambassador Nicholas Repnin and the Russian army, with King Stanisław August Poniatowski being appointed due to his ties as former favourite to the Russian Empress Catherine II. Repnin had forcefully passed the Perpetual Treaty of 1768 between Poland and Russia, which was disadvantageous to Poland geopolitically, challenged the political supremacy of Poland's Catholic faith, prevented reform of the liberum veto, and allowed Warsaw's occupation by Russian troops. Rising unrest led to the massive revolt of the Bar Confederation, which became an alliance of noble, Roman Catholic, and peasant rebels. In the fortified town called Bar, near the Ottoman border, the Bar Confederation was created on 29 February 1768, led by a landed Polish noble named Casimir Pulaski. While the Russian army heavily outnumbered the confederates and defeated them several times in direct battle in Podolia Ukraine, bands of rebels waged low scale guerrilla war throughout the Ukraine and southern Poland. On 20 June 1768, the Russian Army captured the fortress of Bar but when one band of surviving confederates fled over to the Turkish border, pursuing troops of kolii, including Zaporozhian Cossacks, clashed with janissary garrison troops. Polish revolts would dog Russia throughout the war and make it impossible for Catherine II to keep control of Poland.

Ottoman situation

In the Ottoman Empire, revolts were widespread. Many noble factions had risen against the power of sultan Mustafa III and would proceed to break away from the Ottoman Empire. In addition to this decentralization of the Empire the Ottomans were also faced with the revival of a unified Persia, which rose to oppose the Turks in Iraq.

Upon the outbreak of the war the Ottomans seemed to have the upper hand as Russia was suffering from financial strain as a consequence of involvement in the Seven Years' War. The Turkish Navy capitalized on the inferiority of Russia's navy, even though Russia employed British officers to resolve this weakness. The Ottomans dominated the Black Sea, giving it the advantage of shorter supply lines. The Ottomans were also able to levy troops from their vassal state, the Crimean Khanate, to fight the Russians, but their effectiveness was undermined by constant Russian destabilization of the area. In the years preceding the war the Ottoman Empire had enjoyed the longest period of peace with Europe in its history (1739–1768). Nevertheless, the Ottoman Empire faced internal division, rebellion and corruption compounded by the re-emergence of a unified Persian leadership, under Nader Shah. One clear advantage for the Ottomans was its superior numbers as the Ottoman army was three times the size of its Russian counterpart. However, the new Grand Vizier Mehmed Emin Pasha would prove himself to be incompetent militarily.  The Russian army massed along the borders with Poland and the Ottoman Empire, which made it difficult for Ottomans troops to make inroads into Russian territory.

Russian invasion

Not content to let the Polish enemy flee over the border, Cossacks followed them into the Ottoman Empire. In the summer of 1768, Mustafa III received reports that the town of Balta had been massacred by Russian paid Zaporozhian Cossacks. Russia denied the accusations, but it was reported that the Cossacks "certainly razed Balta and killed whomever they found". With the confederates of Poland and the French embassy pushing the sultan along, with many pro-war advisors, the sultan on October 6 imprisoned Aleksei Mikhailovich Obreskov and the entire Russian embassy's staff, marking the Ottoman's declaration of war on Russia.

After her victories in the war, Catherine II was depicted in portraits dressed in the military uniforms of Great Britain, which was initially a willing ally to Russia because of the trade between the two countries. Great Britain needed bar iron to fuel its ongoing Industrial Revolution as well as other products such as sailcloth, hemp, and timber, for the construction and maintenance of its Navy, all of which Russia could provide. When the tide of the conflict turned in Russia's favour, Britain limited its support, seeing Russia as a rising competitor in Far Eastern trade, rather than merely as a counterbalance to the French navy in the Mediterranean. While Russia remained in a superior position in the Black Sea, the withdrawal of British support left Russia unable to do anything more than cut down its own supply lines and disrupt Turkish trade in the area.

In January 1769, Crimean Khan Qırım Giray invaded the Russian held territories in modern-day Ukraine. Crimean Tatars and Nogais ravaged New Serbia and took a significant number of prisoners.

On September 17, 1769, the Russians began their initial campaign over the Dniester into Moldavia. The elite Ottoman Janissaries took heavy casualties from the Russians at Khotyn but managed to hold on; the remainder of the Ottoman army panicked and abandoned the field, and the Russians claimed the fortress. With the Ottomans in disarray the Russians took the capital of Moldavia (Jassy) on October 7. They continued the advance south into Wallachia, occupying its capital Bucharest on November 17. From the capital of Bucharest, the Russians fanned out through the principality, only later being challenged by Grand Vizier Mehmed Emin Pasha at Kagul on Aug 1, 1770. The Russians routed the Grand Vizier's forces and allegedly one-third of the Ottoman troops drowned in the Danube trying to escape.

Caucasian front

By now, Russia had some troops spread out north of the Caucasus. In 1769, as a diversion, the Russians sent Gottlieb Heinrich Totleben with a small expeditionary force south into Georgia. The Georgians defeated an Ottoman army at Aspindza in 1770. The siege of Poti on the Black Sea coast by a joint Russo-Georgian force in 1771 failed and Russian troops were withdrawn in the spring of 1772. It was the first time Russian troops had crossed the Caucasus. On the steppes north of the mountains, the later-famous Matvei Platov and 2,000 men fought 25,000 Turks and Crimeans. The Cossack village of Naur was defended against 8,000 Turks and tribesmen.

Russian Mediterranean expedition

During the war, a Russian fleet, under Count Alexei Grigoryevich Orlov, entered the Mediterranean Sea for the first time in history. It came from the Baltic Sea and was intended to draw Ottoman naval forces out from the Black Sea. In Greece, Orlov's arrival sparked a Maniot revolt against the Ottoman authorities. However, the Ottoman vizier  called on the provincial notables (ayans) of Ottoman Albania to mobilize irregular troops, which he used to crush the revolt in 1771.

Just outside the city of Chesme on June 24, 1770, twelve Russian ships engaged twenty-two Turkish vessels and destroyed them with the use of fire ships. The defeat at Chesme demoralized the Ottomans, and bolstered Russian morale. Catherine II used this and other victories over the Turks to consolidate her reign over Russia domestically by commissioning medals in honour of the battle. Despite their naval successes, the Russians were unable to capture Constantinople because of Ottoman fortifications as well as European concerns that victory would upset the balance of power.

In 1771, Ali Bey al-Kabir, the Mamluk usurper of Egypt, allied with Zahir al-Umar, the autonomous sheikh of Acre, against their Ottoman overlords. The Egyptian general Abu al-Dhahab marched on Damascus, but the Ottoman governor, Uthman Pasha al-Kurji, convinced him to turn on his erstwhile master. Abu al-Dhahab then marched on Egypt and forced Ali Bey to flee to Zahir. Now, Count Orlov, with Catherine's approval, intervened and established friendly relations with the two anti-Ottoman rebels. The Russian fleet provided critical aid in the Battle of Sidon and it bombarded and occupied Beirut. The Russians surrendered Beirut to the pro-Ottoman emir of Mount Lebanon, Yusuf Shihab, only after being paid a large ransom.

In 1773, Yusuf Shihab entrusted the strengthening of Beirut's defences to Ahmad al-Jazzar. When the latter began to act independently, Yusuf got into contact with Zahir al-Umar to remove him. Zahir suggested that they enlist the Russians. The Russian squadron, under Captain Ivan Kozhukov, blockaded and bombarded Beirut while Zahir negotiated Jazzar's withdrawal. The latter then entered Zahir's service, only to rebel against him after a few months. In consequence, the Russians occupied Beirut for a second time, for four months, to force Yusuf to pay a ransom.

Mediation and ceasefire
Prussia, Austria, and Great Britain offered to mediate the dispute between Russia and the Ottomans to halt Russia's expansion. Austria managed to turn the situation to its advantage by gaining physical land concessions from the Ottomans with a treaty on July 6, 1771. The Austrians maintained their increased military presence on their border with Moldavia and Wallachia, and they increased a subsidy to the cash-starved Ottomans, who had been dabbling in tax farming) and offered unsubstantiated support to the Ottomans against Russia. Catherine II, wary of the proximity of the Austrian army to her own forces and fearing an all-out European war, accepted the loss of Poland and agreed to Frederick II’s plan to partition Poland. She secretly agreed to return the captured principalities back to the Ottomans, thereby removing Austria's fear of a powerful Russian Balkan neighbour. On April 8, 1772, Kaunitz, the Austrian equivalent of Minister of Foreign affairs, informed the Porte that Austria no longer considered the treaty of 1771 binding.

A ceasefire between Russia and the Ottoman Empire commenced on May 30, 1772, but real negotiations did not begin until August 8. The peace talks broke down almost immediately over the Crimea, but the truce was extended until March 20, 1773.

Both parties had reasons to expand the negotiations, primarily to do with both sides wanting to keep fighting on a single front. The Ottomans were now quelling rebellions from Egypt and Syria and also faced incursions from Persia. The Russians were facing a revival of a centralized Sweden, which had undergone a coup from King Gustav III.

Final Russian offensive
On June 20, 1774, the Russian army, under the command of Alexander Suvorov, managed to rout the Ottoman army near Kozludzha. Russia used the victory to force the Ottoman Empire to acquiesce to Russia's preferences in the treaty.

Peace treaty
On July 21, 1774, the Ottoman Empire had to sign perforce the Treaty of Küçük Kaynarca. The treaty did not overtly take away vast territories from the Ottomans – Poland had already paid the price of alienated territory. According to the treaty:

 The Crimean Khanate formally gained its independence from both powers (but in reality became dependent on Russia and in 1782 was directly annexed after bloody clashes between the Christian and Tatar populations).
 Russia received war reparations of 4.5 million rubles
 the Ottoman Empire ceded to Russia two key seaports, Azov and Kerch, allowing the Russian Navy and merchant fleet direct access to the Black Sea
 Russia gained the territory between the rivers Dnieper and Southern Bug
 the Porte renounced Ottoman claims to Kabarda in the North Caucasus
 Russia gained official status as protector of the Orthodox Christians living in the Ottoman Empire, which opened the door for future Russian expansion

As a consequence of the treaty, the Ottomans ceded the northwestern part of Moldavia (later known as Bukovina) to the Habsburg Empire.

Russia quickly exploited Küçük Kaynarca for an easy excuse to go to war and take more territory from the Ottoman Empire.

This war comprised but a small part of the continuous process of expansion of the Russian Empire southwards and eastwards during the 18th and 19th centuries.

See also
 History of the Russo-Turkish wars
 Greek Plan

References

Sources

 Aksan, Virginia. "The One-Eyed Fighting the Blind: Mobilization, Supply, and Command in the Russo-Turkish War of 1768–1774." International History Review 15#2 (1993): 221–238.
 Aksan, Virginia. "Breaking the spell of the Baron de Tott: reframing the question of military reform in the Ottoman empire, 1760–1830." International History Review 24.2 (2002): 253–277.
 De Madariaga, Isabel. Russia in the Age of Catherine the Great (1981) pp 205–14.

 
1760s conflicts
1770s conflicts
History of Crimea
Wars involving Poland
Russo-Turkish wars
Warfare of the Early Modern period
Wars involving Georgia (country)
1771 in the Ottoman Empire
18th century in Greece
Military operations involving the Crimean Khanate
1760s in the Ottoman Empire
1770s in the Ottoman Empire
1760s in the Russian Empire
1770s in the Russian Empire
1768 in the Ottoman Empire
1768 in the Russian Empire
18th century in Ukraine
Military history of Ukraine
Catherine the Great
18th century in Bulgaria